Addon (etymology unknown) was one of the persons named in the Neh. 7:61 who could not "shew
their father's house" on the return from captivity. This, with similar instances (ver. 63), indicates the importance the Jews attached to their genealogies.

References

Hebrew Bible people